The following are lists of Sega games:

General lists 
 List of Sega video games
 List of Sega arcade games
 List of Sega mobile games

Pinball machines 
 List of Sega Pinball machines

By systems 
 List of SG-1000 games
 List of Master System games
 List of Sega Genesis games
 List of Game Gear games
 List of Sega CD games
 List of Sega 32X games
 List of Sega Saturn games
 List of Dreamcast games

See also 
 List of Sega video game consoles
 List of Sega video game franchises